Dominique Zinkpe (born 1969, in Cotonou, Benin) is a contemporary African artist. He won an award from the West African Economic and Monetary Union in 2002 for "Malgie Tout!"

Biography 
Dominique Zinkpè, a self-taught artist, was born in Cotonou, Benin, in 1969. He began documenting his work at the library of the Centre Culturel Français, where he discovered a new cosmos and opened himself up to the world, when he was very young. In 1993, he had his first exhibition at the Chinese Cultural Center in Cotonou, where he was given "the status of Artist," as he likes to call it. In the same year, he was chosen to represent Benin at the Grapholies exhibition in Abidjan, where he was awarded the Young African Talent Award.

Career 
Dominique specializes in plastic writing and works with a variety of media (installation, drawing, painting, sculpture, video). His work frequently confronts, occasionally highlights, and condemns. Zinkpè's paintings are inspired by his surroundings and the circumstances in which he finds himself. Zinkpè's paintings follow winding courses in which the protagonists, who are halfway between human and animal, evoke games of power, disguise, or sex, alluding to our own human comedy. On the canvas, he has a distinct style that is intimate, strong, and provocative. His sculptures are often made of coiled burlap or miniature merged wooden figurines.

Awards 
In 1993, he won the Prix Jeune Talent Africain (Young African Talent) Award at the Grapholie in Abidjan.

In 2002, at the Dakar Biennale he received the West African Economic and Monetary Union (UEMOA) Prize for his installation Malgie Tout.

References

1969 births
Living people